The 2004–05 Bulgarian Cup was the 65th season of the Bulgarian Cup. Levski Sofia won the competition, beating CSKA Sofia 2–1 in the final at the Vasil Levski National Stadium in Sofia.

First round
In this round entered winners from the preliminary rounds together with the teams from B Group.

Second round
This round featured winners from the First Round and all teams from A Group.

Third round

Quarter-finals

Semi-finals

First legs

Second legs

Final

Details

Top scorers

References

2004-05
2004–05 domestic association football cups
Cup